Nicholas John Konrad de Jager (born 7 February 1990) is a South African professional rugby union player.

Career

Maties

De Jager played Varsity Cup rugby with Stellenbosch-based university side  in 2012 and 2013. In 2012, he made six appearances during the competition to help Maties all the way to the final. He made three appearances in the round-robin stage of the 2013 Varsity Cup, which again saw Maties lose to UP Tuks in the final.

Saracens

He then moved to English Premiership side Saracens in late 2013. He was included in their squad for the 2013–14 LV Cup and made two appearances for the side. His first class debut came in their 41–8 victory over the Newcastle Falcons, where he was named Man of the Match. He made a further two appearances in the competition, a 16–20 defeat to Northampton Saints in the last round of the pool stages and a 7–26 defeat to the same opposition in their Quarter Final clash.

He made a further six appearances in the 2014–15 LV Cup. He scored his first career try in their final pool stage match against the Exeter Chiefs, one of two tries he scored in the match to help Saracens to a 35–18 victory. He also scored a try in the final of the competition – again against the Exeter Chiefs – to help Saracens win the trophy for the first time since 1998.

He made a solitary appearance for Saracens in the 2014–15 English Premiership (rugby union), playing the first 48 minutes of their match against the Newcastle Falcons.

He also played two matches for Old Albanian during the 2014–15 National League 1.

Blue Bulls

He returned to South Africa in August 2015 to join up with the  prior to the 2015 Currie Cup Premier Division. He signed a one-year contract with the Pretoria-based side.

References

Saracens F.C. players
South African rugby union players
Rugby union players from Johannesburg
1990 births
Living people
Blue Bulls players
Rugby union flankers